Kourtney and Kim Take Miami (previously titled Kourtney and Khloé Take Miami) is an American reality television series. It premiered on E! on August 16, 2009, as the first Keeping Up with the Kardashians spin-off. The series originally followed sisters Kourtney and Khloé Kardashian as they opened a second D-A-S-H location in Miami Beach, Florida. From the third season onward, sister Kim Kardashian replaced Khloé, who had other work commitments. The third season began filming in October 2012, and premiered on January 20, 2013.

A web series spin-off was created during the third season, titled Lord Disick: Lifestyles of a Lord, the series showcases Disick as he informs viewers on how to live like a "king".

Synopsis
For the first two seasons, Kourtney and Khloé Take Miami followed sisters Kourtney and Khloé Kardashian as they oversee the opening of a D-A-S-H store in Miami Beach, a follow-up to their original store in Calabasas. It also featured Khloé's radio show at Y100, 'Khloé After Dark', co-hosted by Terrence J, and the day-to-day lives of the duo. The third season sees Kim joining Kourtney as they find a new location for D-A-S-H Miami. This is the first Kardashian-related series to air after the birth of Kourtney and boyfriend Scott Disick's son Mason.

Cast

Main
 Kourtney Kardashian
 Khloe Kardashian (main: season 1–2, recurring: season 3)
 Kim Kardashian (main: season 3, recurring: season 1–2)
 Scott Disick

Supporting
 Rob Kardashian
 Mason Disick
 Kanye West
 Jonathan Cheban
 Larsa Pippen
 Simon Huck
 Chapman Ducote
 Dani Campbell

Episodes

Series overview

Season 1 (2009)

Season 2 (2010)

Season 3 (2013)

Ratings
The first-season premiere was viewed by 2.8 million viewers — but only three weeks later lost almost half of its premiere audience. However, ratings recovered as the season finale was viewed by 2.6 million viewers. The season averaged 1.89 million  viewers. The second-season premiere was viewed by 2.607 million viewers and has had a successful run to-date with the lowest rated episode being viewed by only 13.04% less than the premiere with 2.267 million in contrast to the previous season where ratings dropped to 1.475 million. The season finale reached an all-time high with 3.656 million viewers. The season averaged 2.717 million viewers.

References

External links

 
 

2000s American reality television series
2010s American reality television series
2009 American television series debuts
2013 American television series endings
Television series by Bunim/Murray Productions
Television series by Ryan Seacrest Productions
Television shows filmed in Miami
English-language television shows
Television shows set in Miami
Keeping Up with the Kardashians
Reality television spin-offs
E! original programming
Kim Kardashian
American television spin-offs